Cechenena sperlingi is a moth of the  family Sphingidae. It is known from the Philippines.

References

Cechenena
Moths described in 2007